Raymond Abbott (born April 21, 1942) is an American novelist.

Biography
Raymond Herbert Abbott was born in Newburyport, April 21, 1942. He was the son of Myron E., a ship worker, and Evelyn (Foley). He was educated at the University of Massachusetts in 1965 with a B.A. and University of Kentucky graduate studies, 1967–68. He is a member of the Authors Guild. He currently resides in Louisville, KY.

Abbott volunteered at Rosebud Indian Reservation in 1965–66, then community development director in Transitional Housing Program for Sioux tribe at Rosebud, 1966–67. After that, he became an elementary schoolteacher in Lost Creek, KY, 1967–68, followed by being a social worker for the city of Louisville, KY, 1967–68. He then became a social worker in Massachusetts: Pittsfield (1969–70), South End, 1970–73, and finally Newburyport, (1973–).

Awards
 1979 NEA Grant
 1985 Whiting Award

Works

He also is contributes to North American Review, KevinMD, Blue Cloud Quarterly, and Phoenix.

Criticism

Quotes
"Much of my inspiration ... for my first three novels came from living for several years on a Sioux reservation in South Dakota.... My interest is to become a good story teller."

References

External links
Profile at The Whiting Awards

20th-century American novelists
20th-century American male writers
Living people
1942 births
University of Massachusetts Amherst alumni
University of Kentucky alumni
Writers from Newburyport, Massachusetts
American male novelists
Novelists from Massachusetts